The A4005 is a suburban link road running between Hanger Lane roundabout, where the A40 meets the A406 (North Circular Road), and Harrow.  The A4005 now runs along Roxeth Hill to its junction with the A312 in South Harrow, then merges with it northbound until its junction with the A404 before splitting away again to become Greenhill Way. Formerly the road passed the junction with Roxeth Hill, crossing the A404, continuing past Harrow-on-the-Hill station and joining the A409 at a point just south of the present junction. 

Roads in London
Streets in the London Borough of Brent
Streets in the London Borough of Harrow